Damon medius is a species of arachnid of the family Phrynichidae.

Description
This strictly arboreal and nocturnal whip spider has a flat body and fragile legs, by which it moves sideways like a crab. In males the front legs are very long and antenniform, much longer than in the females. It has two large, spiny pedipalps, which are larger in the male than the female. It feeds on small insects.

Distribution and habitat
This species can be found in West Africa, in Benin, Ghana, Guinea, Ivory Coast, Cameroon, Liberia, Mali, Nigeria, São Tomé and Príncipe, Senegal, Sierra Leone and Togo. It lives in wetlands and rainforests.

References 
Lichtenstein & Herbst, 1797 : Naturgeschichte der Insekten-Gattungen. Solpuga und Phalangium.
Prendini, L. (2005). Systematics of the group of African whip spiders (Chelicerata: Amblypygi): Evidence from behaviour, morphology and DNA. Organisms Diversity & Evolution, 5, 203-236.

External links
 Biolib
 Catalogue of Life
 AquaPortail
 Liege.mine
 Insects.tamu.edu
 Lorenzo Prendini, Peter Weygoldt & Ward C. Wheeler  Systematics of the Damon variegatus group of African whip spiders (Chelicerata: Amblypygi): Evidence from behaviour, morphology and DNA
 Panarthropoda

Amblypygi
Animals described in 1797
Invertebrates of West Africa
Fauna of Mali